The 1968 Oregon State Beavers football team represented Oregon State University during the 1968 NCAA University Division football season.  Home games were played on campus in Corvallis at Parker Stadium, with one at Civic Stadium in Portland.

Under fourth-year head coach Dee Andros, the Beavers were 7–3 overall and 5–1 in the Pacific-8 Conference (Pac-8). They were fifteenth in the final AP Poll, and outscored their opponents 285 to 179. The 17–13 loss at USC in November decided the conference title and the Rose Bowl berth. Prior to the 1975 season, the Pac-8 and Big Ten conferences allowed only one postseason participant each, for the Rose Bowl.

The Beavers were led on offense by quarterback Steve Preece and fullback Bill Enyart,  nicknamed "Earthquake;" center John Didion was a consensus All-American.

Schedule

Roster

Season summary

Utah
Bill Enyart 50 Rush, 299 Yds, 3 TD 
Oregon State did not complete a pass (0/4, INT)

Stanford
Bobby Mayes   54 yard reverse for touchdown

Washington
Roger Cantlon 4 Rec, 116 Yds

Kentucky
Enyart 29 Rush, 105 Yds, 4 TD

Washington State
Enyart 31 Rush, 137 Yds, TD

UCLA
Enyart 32 Rush, 155 Yds, 2 TD

Oregon
Enyart 37 Rush, 168 Yds, 3 TD

Statistics
Bill Enyart 293 Rush, 1304 Yds, 17 TD (all three were single season school records until 1999 – Ken Simonton) 
Billy Main 32.1 yards per kick return

Awards
Team MVP: Steve Preece, Jon Sandstrom
All Pac 8: John Didion, Bill Enyart, Jon Sandstrom
All-American: John Didion (AFCA – 1st, AP, Central Press Association, Football News, FWAA – 1st, Newspaper Enterprise Association, Sporting News, Time, UPI, Walter Camp), Bill Enyart (UPI – 1st)

NFL/AFL Draft 
Five Beavers were selected in the 1969 NFL/AFL draft, the third and final common draft, which lasted seventeen rounds (442 selections).

 
Source:

QB Steve Preece was not drafted, but had a nine-year career in the NFL as a defensive back.

References

External links
 Game program: Oregon State at Washington State – October 26, 1968
 WSU Libraries: Game video – Oregon State at Washington State – October 26, 1968

Oregon State
Oregon State Beavers football seasons
Oregon State Beavers football